The Korolev Oil Field is an oil field located in Mangystau Province. It was discovered in 1986 and developed by Tengizchevroil. The oil field is operated and owned by Tengizchevroil.

References 

Oil fields of Kazakhstan
Oil fields of the Soviet Union